Merton Township may refer to the following townships in the United States:

 Merton Township, Steele County, Minnesota
 Merton Township, South Dakota